Halysidota torniplaga is a moth of the family Erebidae. It was described by Reich in 1935. It is found in Brazil.

References

Halysidota
Moths described in 1935